Vanguard is the second album by the British musician Finley Quaye, released in 2000. It followed a tumultuous period in Quaye's life.

The album peaked at No. 35 on the UK Albums Chart. Its first single was "Spiritualized", which was inspired by the birth of Quaye's third child.

Production
The album was produced by Quaye, Kevin Bacon, and Jonathan Quarmby. It was recorded in London over a period of four months.

Critical reception

NME wrote that "there’s something about Vanguard'''s playful disregard for convention that recalls Captain Beefheart's Trout Mask Replica, perhaps the most infamous work within the rock field to thumb its nose at description while giving pretension the big swerve." The Austin Chronicle noted that "Quaye has not only taken the basic trappings of reggae to an entirely different place, he's also molded a thoroughly modern, transglobal sound that transcends the limitations any one genre might impose." The Independent determined that "the coherence of his Maverick A Strike debut seems to have drained away, leaving little more than a series of aimless rock'n'reggae grooves jessied-up with studio effects and sprayed with pointless verbal jetsam."Entertainment Weekly thought that "Quaye’s thoroughly urbanized, half-mad brand of African roots music is alive, well, and wonderfully prickly." The Guardian called Vanguard'' "a fascinating, eclectic album that goes far beyond the promise of the debut, establishing Quaye as an unignorable 21st-century talent."

AllMusic wrote: "Envision a penny dreadful being sung aloud inside a pub while Roni Size tries to squeeze drunken gospeltronica out of his sequencer banks."

Track listing

Charts

References

2000 albums
Albums produced by Kevin Bacon (producer)
Epic Records albums